Bram Groeneweg (13 March 1905 – 24 April 1988) was a Dutch long-distance runner. He competed in the marathon at the 1928 Summer Olympics.

References

External links
 

1905 births
1988 deaths
Athletes (track and field) at the 1928 Summer Olympics
Dutch male long-distance runners
Dutch male marathon runners
Olympic athletes of the Netherlands
People from Spijkenisse
Sportspeople from South Holland
20th-century Dutch people